Sir Richard Sherborn (by 1522–94), of Stonyhurst, Lancashire, was an English politician.

He was a Member (MP) of the Parliament of England for Lancashire in October 1553, Preston in November 1554 and 1558, and Liverpool in 1555.

References

Year of birth missing
1594 deaths
Members of the Parliament of England (pre-1707) for Lancashire
English MPs 1553 (Mary I)
English MPs 1554–1555
English MPs 1555
English MPs 1558
Members of the Parliament of England (pre-1707) for Liverpool